Homeland Security USA or Border Security: America's Frontline for Australian Viewers is a 2009 reality show. It portrayed members of the U.S. Department of Homeland Security, and other agencies tasked with the security of the US, performing their day-to-day duties.  It was the American version of the Australian reality show Border Security. The show premiered on January 6, 2009 on ABC and was put on hiatus May 19, 2009. The show featured officers within Homeland Security, who fought various crimes such as drug trafficking. A few months after the premiere ABC aired episodes on weekend afternoons.

Episodes

References 
 Episode guide at MSN TV

External links 
 

2000s American reality television series
2009 American television series debuts
2009 American television series endings
American Broadcasting Company original programming
American television series based on Australian television series
United States Department of Homeland Security
Television shows set in the United States
Television series about border control